The 1953 Bulgarian Cup was the 13th season of the Bulgarian Cup (in this period the tournament was named Cup of the Soviet Army). Lokomotiv Sofia won the competition, beating Levski Sofia 2–1 in the final at the Vasil Levski National Stadium in Sofia.

First round

|-
!colspan="3" style="background-color:#D0F0C0; text-align:left;" |Replay

|-
!colspan="3" style="background-color:#D0F0C0; text-align:left;" |Second replay

|}

Second round

|-
!colspan="3" style="background-color:#D0F0C0; text-align:left;" |Replay

|}

Quarter-finals

|-
!colspan="3" style="background-color:#D0F0C0; text-align:left;" |Replay

|}

Semi-finals

|}

Final

Details

References

1953
1952–53 domestic association football cups
Cup